2wenty is an American mixed-media artist and photographer from Los Angeles. He is known for using light as the central theme in his work. 2wenty comes from a background in lighting television and film which gives him an intimate understanding of how light works. The sources of light he utilizes for his light paintings are handmade, as well as creating the LED paintings by hand. His works can be viewed both nationally and internationally in Los Angeles, Miami, and London.

Art career 
 
2wenty first emerged in 2011, when his Facebook Social Cigarettes posters started appearing in technology blogs all over the internet and on the streets of Los Angeles and San Francisco. The posters featured a pack of cigarettes with the Facebook logo and a tag that read, "Social Cigarettes."  He created over one hundred of the posters, comparing Facebook consumption with that of "cancer sticks." 2wenty also created three-dimensional versions of the posters, complete with a surgeon general warning, "Facebook may cause loss of time, poor work ethic, obesity, social disorder, and possible interference of destiny. Use at your own risk."

2wenty has had multiple collaborations with fellow artist, Gregory Siff,  in addition to This Means Mar. In December 2013, 2wenty was invited by Mar to show and create one of his "signature" light paintings at his solo show 'I Crave Love',  which was held at Lab Art Gallery in Los Angeles.

His works have been exhibited in Los Angeles,  San Francisco, Washington D.C., and at Miami's Art Basel. He has been featured in Forbes, Beverly Hills Lifestyle Magazine, LA Canvas, Leveled Magazine, Melrose and Fairfax, Gawker, and as background themes for the, "My Yahoo", main page on Yahoo.com.

Photography 

2wenty expands his oeuvre into light painting photography. Through long exposures, the camera captures not only the subject, but also the source of light the artist moves across his "canvas". Within these detailed images," There is a depth and other worldliness that records both place and passage of time", says 2wenty.

Art exhibitions 
 Sketch for Japan,Project 1 Gallery, San Francisco, March 21st, 2011
 Above the Radar, Crewest Gallery, Los Angeles, April 2nd, 2011
 Rise Japan, Arc gallery, San Francisco, April 7th, 2011
 Street Heart, The Fold, Los Angeles, April 22nd, 2011
 "What Graffiti is to New York - Street Art is to Los Angeles", Maximillian at Sunset Marque, Hollywood, May 28th, 2011
 Friendly Fire, Le Spec Gallery, Los Angeles, July 9th, 2011
80/20, LA Canvas Headquarters, Los Angeles, October 20th, 2011
 Above the Radar II, The Fridge, Washington DC, November 5th, 2011
 G by Gregory Siff (collaboration), LA Founderie, Los Angeles, November 11th, 2011
 New Urban Voices, Maximillian at Sunset Marque, Hollywood, March 31st, 2012
 Venice Art Walk & Auctions, Bergamot Station, Santa Monica, April 27th, 2012
 Act Social, Active Ride Shop, Santa Monica, May 11th, 2012
 Denim Canvas, The Standard Hollywood, Los Angeles, June 15th, 2012
 Matter of Time by Gregory Siff (collaboration), Gallery Brown, West Hollywood, October 20th, 2012
 The Art of Elysium and Christie's, Pieces of Heaven, (featured in the live auction by Chrisite's), Los Angeles, February 20th, 2013
 Red Bull Canvas Cooler, Factory West, Hollywood, March 28th, 2013
 Donuts with Dawn Kasper, For Your Art in Conjunction with LACMA, Hollywood, April 20th, 2013
 Canvas Streets, Destroy, Rebuild, Repeat Gallery, Santa Monica, April 27th, 2013
 Between Paint and Light, 2wenty X Gregory Siff, Loakal Gallery, Oakland, May 3rd, 2013
 American All Stars, Gallery Brown, West Hollywood, May 18th, 2013
 Venice Art Walk and Auctions Surf and Skate, Robert Berman Gallery @ Bergamot Station, Santa Monica, August 29th, 2013
 Urban Influences in Contemporary Art, Ian Ross Gallery, San Francisco, September 27th, 2013
Wish, Group Exhibition, The Gabba Gallery, Los Angeles, November 16, 2013
One Love, Woven Accents, West Hollywood, February 13, 2014
Pieces of Heaven By Art of Elysium, Siren Studios, Los Angeles, February 26, 2014
Thanks For the Memories, Solo Show, Gallery Brown, Los Angeles, May 17, 2014
Surf & Skate Auctioin, Robert Berman Gallery, Bergamot Station, Santa Monica, August 28, 2014
Skate & Create, Flower Pepper Gallery, Pasadena, August 30, 2014
Everyone Pays, Stone Malone Gallery, West Hollywood, October 3, 2014
Art Basel House, Art Basel, Miami, Florida, December 2, 2014
Drawbridge: Art Program For Homeless Children, Zener Schan Gallery, Mill Valley, CA, December 11, 2014
Pieces of Heaven by Art of Elysium, Mama Gallery, Downtown Los Angeles, February 17, 2015

References

External links 
 2wenty Facebook Page
 Photos of One Photographer's Trippy and Stunning 'Light Paintings', LAist, July 2014

Living people
People from Los Angeles
Photographers from California
Mixed-media artists
Year of birth missing (living people)